The Kreider-Reisner Midget was an American light racing monoplane, the first aircraft designed by the Kreider-Reisner Aircraft Company of Hagerstown, Maryland.

Design and development
The Midget was a low-wing racing monoplane powered by a  Wright-Morehouse engine which first flew in 1926.  Designed by Charles W Meyers and engineered by Frederick E. Seiler, Jr., it should not be confused with the Meyers Midget a high-wing monoplane built in the Kreider-Reisner factory for Meyers in the same year. The Midget won the Scientific American Trophy at the 1926 Nationals.

Specifications

References

1920s United States sport aircraft
Racing aircraft
Midget
Single-engined tractor aircraft
Low-wing aircraft
Aircraft first flown in 1926